Tengku Tan Sri Dato' Haji Mohamad Rizam bin Tengku Abdul Aziz (born 18 July 1961) is a member of the Kelantan Royal Family, who is the Tengku Temenggong of Kelantan. He is a cousin of the current Sultan of Kelantan, Sultan Muhammad V.

Tengku Mohamad Rizam is the President of the Kelantan Islamic Religious and Malay Customs Council (MAIK) and the Chairman of the Kelantan State Service Commission (SPN). He is also a Pro-Chancellor of Universiti Malaysia Kelantan (UMK) and was proclaimed on 13 October 2018.

Early life and education 
Tengku Mohamad Rizam was born at Istana Kota Lama in Kota Bharu, Kelantan on 18 July 1961. He is the eldest of four siblings to Tengku Sri Utama Raja Tengku Abdul Aziz bin Tengku Muhammad Hamzah and Tengku Puan Sri Utama Raja Tengku Merjan binti Almarhum Sultan Yahya Petra. His father was Malaysia's Ambassador to Saudi Arabia from 1975 to 1978 and to the Netherlands from 1978 to 1982. Tengku Mohamad Rizam's paternal grandparents were Tengku Sri Maharaja Tengku Muhammad Hamzah bin Tengku Zainal Abidin and Nik Zainab binti Nik Ali. His grandfather was the Chief Minister of Kelantan from 1953 to 1959. His maternal grandparents were Sultan Yahya Petra ibni Almarhum Sultan Ibrahim (the 27th Sultan of Kelantan and the 6th Yang di-Pertuan Agong of Malaysia) and Raja Perempuan Zainab II binti Almarhum Tengku Muhammad Petra.

Tengku Mohamad Rizam began his early education at Sekolah Kebangsaan Sultan Ismail (I) in Kota Bharu, Kelantan. He continued his studies at Sekolah Menengah Sultan Ismail in Kota Bharu, Kelantan and Sekolah Menengah Kebangsaan St. John in Kuala Lumpur. He then studied A-Level at Cheltenham College, England. He graduated from the Ohio University, Athens, Ohio, United States with a Bachelor of Business Administration (Hons) Major in Marketing and obtained a Master of Business Administration (MBA) from the United States International University, San Diego, California, United States.

Career 
Tengku Mohamad Rizam began his banking career in 1986 and then he retired in 2014 while he was holding the position of Chief Technology Officer and Senior Vice President of RHB Islamic Bank.

On 6 September 2014, Tengku Mohamad Rizam was appointed as the Chairman of the Kelantan State Service Commission (SPN). Later, he was appointed as the President of the Kelantan Islamic Religious and Malay Customs Council (MAIK) on 19 March 2019. He was also the Commander of the 506 Territorial Army Regiment from 2 August 2012 to 1 August 2021 and holds the rank of Brigadier General.

Appointment history 
In 1999, Tengku Mohamad Rizam was appointed as Tengku Sri Jaya Raja of Kelantan by the then-Sultan of Kelantan, Sultan Ismail Petra and held the post for eleven years. In 2010, Tengku Mohamad Rizam was raised the rank to Tengku Panglima Raja of Kelantan by the then-Regent of Kelantan, Tengku Muhammad Faris Petra and held the post for three years. On 25 November 2013, Tengku Mohamad Rizam was promoted as Tengku Temenggong of Kelantan by the current Sultan of Kelantan, Sultan Muhammad V. He is also a member of State Royal Succession Council of Kelantan.

Personal life
On 18 July 1991, Tengku Mohamad Rizam married Tunku Noor Hayati, the daughter of the first Prime Minister of Malaysia, Tunku Abdul Rahman Putra.

They have two sons and a daughter named Tengku Nur Qistina Petri, Tengku Abdul Rahman Petra and Tengku Yahya Aziz Petra.

Honours
He has been awarded: 
 :
  Knight Grand Commander of the Order of the Life of the Crown of Kelantan (SJMK) – Dato' (1999)
  Knight Grand Commander of the Order of the Crown of Kelantan (SPMK) – Dato' (2010)
  Recipient of the Royal Family Order of Kelantan (DK) (2017)

 :
  Commander of the Order of Loyalty to the Crown of Malaysia (PSM) – Tan Sri (2017)
  Malaysian Armed Forces:
  Warrior of the Most Gallant Order of Military Service (PAT)

His wife, Tunku Noor Hayati, Tengku Puan Temenggong Kelantan has been awarded:
 :
  Knight Commander of the Order of the Life of the Crown of Kelantan (DJMK) - Dato' (2012)

Ancestry

References

1961 births
Living people
Royal House of Kelantan
Malaysian people of Malay descent
Malaysian businesspeople